Saraon is a village situated in Rohtas District of Bihar state, India. It is 20 km. from the Dehri-on-Son railway station on the way to Bikramganj via Nasriganj.

Saraon is the part of Panchgaon (five villages of Saryupareen Brahmins Pandey). Other villages are Hawdih, Virodih, Mangitpur and Sohgi.

Villages in Rohtas district